Song Yue (born 20 November 1991) is a Chinese footballer currently playing as a defender for Tianjin Jinmen Tiger.

Club career
Song Yue would play for the Jiangsu Suning youth team, however instead of immediately continuing with his football career he would instead continue with his studies and go to Hohai University where he still played football in the Chinese University Football League. He also represented China in the 2015 Summer Universiade tournament. While he completed his studies he would play for amateur football club Suzhou Dongwu. With them he would see them quickly go up the leagues and become a professional team once they won the CMCL division in 2015. After a season of professional football he would return to Hohai University as they signed a cooperation deal with Nanjing Shaye to utilize their football squad and participate within the CMCL.

Song returned to professional football with a move to third tier football club Nantong Zhiyun and with them he gained promotion with the club at the end of the 2018 China League Two campaign. The following season he would play a vital role in ensuring the club remained in the division and on 30 July 2020, Song transferred to top tier football club Tianjin TEDA for the start of the 2020 Chinese Super League campaign for a reported fee of 2 million Yuan. He would make his debut on 6 August 2020 in a league game against Beijing Sinobo Guoan F.C. that ended in a 3-1 defeat.

Career statistics

Honours

Club
Suzhou Dongwu
 CMCL: 2015

References

External links

1991 births
Living people
Chinese footballers
Hohai University alumni
China League Two players
China League One players
Chinese Super League players
Suzhou Dongwu F.C. players
Nantong Zhiyun F.C. players
Tianjin Jinmen Tiger F.C. players
Association football midfielders